Ross University School of Medicine (RUSM) is a private for-profit medical school. Its main campus is located in Barbados, and administrative offices are located in Miramar, Florida, in the United States. Prior to 2019, the university's main campus was in Portsmouth, Dominica but moved to its present location in Barbados in January 2019. RUSM is owned by Adtalem Global Education Inc.

History

Foundation
The medical school was founded in 1978 as The University of Dominica School of Medicine by Robert Ross, as a provider of medical education offering Doctor of Medicine (MD) degree programs, due to the scarcity of medical schools and physicians in the U.S., at the time. The university primarily serves students from the United States and Canada. In 1984, the university officially changed its name to Ross University School of Medicine.

Ross University School of Medicine's charter class included twelve students. In 2013, the 10,000th graduate of Ross received their medical degree from the school.

Early years and controversy
In 1984, NJ Board of Medical Examiners ruled that the Ross University School of Medicine may no longer send students to hospitals in New Jersey for the hands-on part of their training due to significant weaknesses in the educational program. In 1985, California state medical licensing officials (the Board of Medical Quality Assurance), 
began investigating RUSM, along with other medical schools located in the Caribbean. The officials released a 
report stating that RUSM had nearly no admissions standards, and that the school was in the business of providing medical degrees 
to "everyone that wants one." 
Those events prompted RUSM to agree to implement a number of changes recommended by the California board. 
RUSM has since graduated over 11,000 practicing physicians eligible to practice in all 50 states.

On June 30, 1990, RUSM obtained recognition from the Medical Board of California. In October 1999, the New York State Department of Education approved RUSM students to complete more than 12 weeks of clinical clerkships in New York State.

In the late 1990s, RUSM expressed interest in opening a U.S.-based medical school in Casper, Wyoming, but accreditation was denied by the Liaison Committee on Medical Education, the organization that accredits MD-granting medical schools in the United States. Some local individuals welcomed the economic impact of a new medical school on the town, but critics questioned the quality of education at a for-profit institution.

2000 to present
In 2003, Ross University School of Medicine was acquired by Adtalem Global Education.

In 2017, the school was impacted by Hurricane Maria, when the Category 5 storm made landfall on the island of Dominica. The hurricane knocked out communications, effectively isolating RUSM from the outside world. The campus suffered moderate damage from the effects of Maria. Students and faculty were evacuated from the campus to the U.S. mainland.
 In October 2017, the university resumed classes aboard the GNV Excellent, an Italian ferry docked off the coast of the island of St. Kitts. Medical students at Ross did not find the conditions on the vessel suitable for medical education. The vessel contained few electrical outlets or locations to study, and students experienced sea-sickness. In November 2017, Ross University School of Medicine relocated temporarily to Knoxville, Tennessee, for continuation of medical school classes. Lincoln Memorial University (LMU), based in Harrogate, Tennessee, and with operations in Knoxville, provided the operational capacity and the technical capabilities to support RUSM faculty, students, and staff.

Ross University School of Medicine permanently relocated from Dominica to Barbados for the beginning of the 2019 Spring semester due to extensive damage done in Dominica after Hurricane Maria.

In 2019, Ross developed partnerships with Dillard University, Charles Drew University of Medicine and Science, Florida Agricultural and Mechanical University, and Tuskegee University to "expand the black physician pipeline." They also added partnerships with Cal State Dominguez Hills and Oakwood University to increase physician diversity in the US.

Accreditation and recognition

RUSM is accredited by the following agencies:
Barbados Medical Council (BMC)
Caribbean Accreditation Authority for Education in Medicine and other Health Professions (CAAM-HP)

It is recognized by:
National Committee on Foreign Medical Education and Accreditation (NCFMEA) through the U.S. Department of Education, allowing American students to participate in the U.S. Federal Direct Student Loan Program
World Directory of Medical Schools
General Medical Council of Great Britain

The university also has state-specific recognition and/or approval from Florida, California, New Jersey, Indiana  and New York. Ross University School of Medicine is approved by the New York State Education Department (NYSED) to allow students to complete more than 12 weeks of clinical clerkships in New York State. RUSM is one of eight Caribbean medical schools so approved by NYSED.

Student life

Campus
The Ross University School of Medicine pre-clinical campus is located at the Lloyd Erskine Sandiford Centre at Two Mile Hill in Barbados. This facility is divided between the university's campus and a conference center for the government.  The campus features a medical and anatomical imaging laboratory as well as a clinical simulation center.

Housing
The university does not offer traditional dormitory housing options. Most students live in an off-campus university-affiliated housing complex within The Villages of Coverley, which features 2-bedroom, 3-bedroom, and 4-bedroom houses.

Academic profile

Admissions 
Ross University School of Medicine acceptance rate is 42.7%. Students are required to take the MCAT. The average MCAT for admitted students is 493 
(25% percentile).

Rankings and reputation
RUSM was ranked in the top tier of Caribbean Medical Schools by the World Scholarship Forum (2020), in the top ten in a Money Inc. article in 2019, and is listed on the WHO's World Directory of Medical Schools.

Degrees 
RUSM awards a single academic degree: Doctor of Medicine (MD).

Curriculum 
The curriculum is composed of the medical sciences curriculum (first two years of the program) and the clinical science curriculum (last two years). The medical sciences portion follows an organ systems-based model. This is the most widely used model in American medical schools. After completing the medical sciences portion of the curriculum, students return to the United States to complete their USMLE Step 1 board exam. After successfully completing the exam, students begin their clinical clerkship at a range of hospital sites from Los Angeles to New York City.

The clinical science portion of the program is composed of 90 weeks of clinical clerkships: 48 weeks of required core rotations and 42 weeks of electives  with students having the option to complete their clerkships in the United States or the United Kingdom. The university has established contracts with hospitals to accept and place their third and fourth-year medical students in clinical rotations.

Academic outcomes

According to the US Department of Education, 56.6% of students completed the program on time in 2019.

Pass rates of students and graduates on United States Medical Licensing Examinations (USMLE) in calendar year 2019 were as follows:  Step 1 – Basic Science 96.73%  Step 2 – Clinical Knowledge 96.86%  

To be eligible to take the step1 examination medical students must first pass a practice NBME examination.  US medical schools do not have this requirement.  

In comparison, the Step 1 and Step 2 CK pass rates among 110 medical schools as reported by the U.S. News Best Medical Schools rankings are presented below: 
 
Step 1 – Basic Science 96.3%  
 
Step 2 – Clinical Knowledge 96.6%

RUSM claims that its graduates had an NRMP first-time residency attainment rate of 95.2% in 2019-2020 which is very similar to the historical 92-94% match rate of U.S. allopathic Medical Schools per the National Resident Matching Program®.

Student loan debt
Median student loan debt for those who started in 2012-2013 was $318,071. The US Department of Education reports median student loan debt of Americans who attended was $349,973 in 2019.

Alumni
Since opening in 1978, the university reports that it has graduated over 15,000 students who are practicing in the US and Canada. A large proportion of the university graduates are primary care physicians which is typical for Caribbean medical schools graduates, with 2,611 of those being family medicine doctors. To put these numbers in context, a census conducted in 2016 established there were 985,026  active physicians in the United States., and it was estimated in 2010 that the active primary care physician population is 209,000. RUSM is the second international school with the greatest amount of licensed physicians in the United States (after St. George's University) per the 2018 FSMB Survey with 9,930 licensed physicians.

Some notable graduates include:

 Maggie Tomecka, MD –  Former member of the United States U-21 national soccer team
 Nicole Saphier, MD – Director of Breast Imaging at Memorial Sloan Kettering Monmouth, author 
 Michael R. Williams, DO, MD – president of the University of North Texas Health Science Center

See also
 International medical graduate
 List of medical schools in the Caribbean

References

External links
Ross University School of Medicine official site

Medical schools in Barbados
Medical schools in the Caribbean
Educational institutions established in 1978
1978 establishments in North America
Adtalem Global Education